Cockatoo Grove was a populated place in San Diego County, California, United States. As of 2015, the former location of Cockatoo Grove is within the Otay Lakes neighborhood of Chula Vista, California.

References

Unincorporated communities in San Diego County, California
Unincorporated communities in California